Deborah Abela (born 13 October 1966) is an Australian author of children's books, most notably the Max Remy, Super Spy series, Grimsdon and Teresa – A New Australian. She was born in Sydney, Australia, and has been writing for 15 years. She does the Virtual Book Week Dart Session for kids.

Awards

2017 KOALA Legend (Kids Own Literature Awards)
2017, 2012, 2011 Grimsdon Shortlisted for YABBA and KOALA awards
2017 Teresa – A New Australian Shortlisted for WAYRBA Awards (Western Australian Young Readers Book Awards)
2017 Teresa – A New Australian Best Book in Translation, Malta Book Awards
2017 The Stupendously Spectacular Spelling Bee shortlisted for the Australian Family Therapists Awards
2015 Ghost Club series shortlisted for KOALA, YABBA, CROC awards
2015 New City shortlisted for the KOALA, YABBA, CROC awards
H
2013 Ghost Club series shortlisted for Sisters In Crime Davitt Awards
2013 Maurice Saxby Award for Services to Children's Literature
2012 The Remarkable Secret of Aurelie Bonhoffen shortlisted Outstanding International Book Award USBBY
2011 Grimsdon awarded Most Enthralling Junior Fiction Award
2011 Grimsdon shortlisted Aurealis Awards
2011 Grimsdon shortlisted Speech Pathology Awards
2010 The Remarkable Secret of Aurelia Bonhoffen, was shortlisted for best children's book in the 2010, and was awarded "Notable Book of 2010" by the Children's Book Council of Australia.
2010 The Remarkable Secret of Aurelie Bonhoffen shortlisted for the Aurealis Awards
2010, 2007, 2005 Max Remy Superspy voted best series KOALA and YABBA awards
2008 Max Remy Superspy Angus and Robertson's Top 50 books
2007 Max Remy Superspy shortlisted USA Children's Choice Awards and WAYRBA awards

In 2008, she was awarded the May Gibbs Fellowship for Children's Literature.

Awarded the 2006 Oppenheim Toy Portfolio Gold Seal Best Book Award.

Bibliography

Max Remy Superspy Books
 In Search of the Time and Space Machine – Random House (Milsons Point, NSW) (2002) 
 Spyforce Revealed – Random House (Milsons Point, NSW) (2002) 
 The Nightmare Vortex – Random House (Milsons Point, NSW) (2003) 
 The Hollywood Mission – Random House (Milsons Point, NSW) (2003) 
 The Amazon Experiment – Random House (Milsons Point, NSW) (2004) 
 Blue's Revenge – Random House (Milsons Point, NSW) (2004) 
 The Venice Job – Random House (Milsons Point, NSW) (2005) 
 Mission in Malta – Random House (Milsons Point, NSW) (2006) 
 The French Code – Random House (Milsons Point, NSW) (2007) 
 The Final Curtain – Random House (Milsons Point, NSW) (2008)

Jasper Zammit Soccer Legend
 The Game of Life with Johnny Warren – Random House (Milsons Point, NSW) (2005) 
 The Striker with Johnny Warren – Random House (Milsons Point, NSW) (2005) 
 The Finals with Johnny Warren – Random House (Milsons Point, NSW) (2006)

Other books
 Wolfie – An Unlikely Hero, Penguin Random House (North Sydney, NSW) (2017)  
 The Stupendously Spectacular Spelling Bee Penguin Random House (North Sydney, NSW) (2017) 
 Teresa – A New Australian - Scholastic Australia (2016) 
 New City – Random House (North Sydney, NSW) (2014) 
 Jasper Zammit – Soccer Legend  (Bind-up 3 books in 1) Random House (North Sydney, NSW) (2014)
 Grimsdon – Random House (North Sydney, NSW) (2010) 
 The Remarkable Secret of Aurelie Bonhoffen – Random House (North Sydney, NSW) (2009) 
 The Ghosts of Gribblesea Pier – Farrar, Straus and Giroux (US) (2011) 
 Bug Club Charlie and Alice – Heinemann Secondary Education (2012) 
 Ghost Club 1: The New Kid – Random House (2012) 
 Ghost Club 2: The Haunted School – Random House (2012) 
 Ghost Club 3: A Transylvanian Tale – Random House (2013)

References

External links
 

1966 births
Living people
Australian children's writers
Australian women children's writers